XHETE-FM is a radio station on 106.3 FM in Tehuacán, Puebla, Mexico. It is owned by Cinco Radio and is known as Vive FM.

History

XETE-AM 1140 received its concession on November 9, 1983. The 1,000-watt daytimer was owned by Francisco González Barraza, and later by his successors. In 2000, XETE was acquired by Laura and Francisco González Gasca, as well as Arturo, Claudia, Jonathan, Alejandro and Alberto González Martínez. The current concessionaire was established in 2003.

XETE was cleared to move to FM in 2011 but was given a continuity obligation to serve 29,486 potential listeners who did not receive other radio service. The IFT awarded a concession in 2020 for a social station to replace this obligation, XECSAL-AM 1140.

References

External links
Vive FM 106.3 XHETE Facebook

Radio stations in Puebla
Radio stations in Mexico with continuity obligations